Lee (Becker) Theodore was a Broadway director/choreographer and performer.  Born in the 1930s to Russian Jewish immigrants Zena and Genya Becker, and raised in Upper Manhattan and the Bronx, she began dance lessons at the age of 4. As a child, she often performing at her parents' "Veyetcherinkas"—Russian cultural arts nights in their home with her brother Eugene Becker (who later became a New York Philharmonic violist) and her sister, Rita (later Zweig). As she developed as a young dancer, she became recognized for her extraordinary talent and ability. She got her first professional job as a dancer in a ballet company when she still a teenager. As her dance career developed, she moved on from Classical ballet to the wildly creative work then being done in modern dance, Broadway, and what later became known as jazz dance.  She was richly recognized in the field, working with all the top artists.

As a young dancer, Lee (then still Becker) appeared as Anybodys in the original production of West Side Story; indeed, the role was created for her by Jerome Robbins. She also performed in Tenderloin and The King And I.

As a choreographer, Theodore created dances for Baker Street, Darling Of The Day, Flora, The Red Menace and in 1967, was nominated for the Tony Award for The Apple Tree.  This was a time period of rich cross pollination of various styles of dance, and Theodore's work seamlessly and fluidly melded many influences. She also choreographed the feature film, Song Of Norway.

Later in her career, Theodore founded and created The American Dance Machine, which was a living archive of Broadway theatre dance, with seasons on Broadway and international tours. Originally, American Dance Machine was created to rescue great Broadway choreography which, at the time, often was neither filmed nor notated. While the great shows had musical scores and Books to preserve dialogue, the great dances were doomed to be lost. Theodore's "rescue sessions" brought the original dancers from Broadway shows into the studio. Often, they had not performed these dances for many years. But with the understanding that memory resides in a dancer's body, the collaborators played music from the shows and the dancers gradually recreated the choreography—often starting with the memory of just a single step. Once recreated, the dances were filmed and notated. But dances must be performed to be truly alive and accessible, so Theodore trained a group of talented performers to bring these dances live to audiences. Through this process, American Dance Machine saved the choreography of Agnes De Mille, Jack Cole, Joe Layton, Michael Kidd, Ron Field, Bob Fosse, Onna White and Peter Gennaro. Featured dancers and guest artists included Janet Eilber, Carol Estey, Harold Cromer, Liza Gennaro, Patti Mariano, Nancy Chismar and Donald Young.

For many years, Theodore taught a daily Broadway Dance class—perhaps the first such class ever—at Harkness Dance Center on the Upper East Side. Her class, which relied on dancers' previous and significant ballet training, was divided into decades by day: Mondays 1950s (think West Side Story), Tuesdays 1960s, Wednesdays 1970s, and so on.  She was a tough teacher who demanded a great deal from her students and was beloved by them. Watching her demonstrate effortlessly in class was a lesson in technique, artistry, and, as she became ill, also of extraordinary determination.

Theodore was married to Paris Theodore and they had two sons, Said and Ali. Although she did not live to see it, she is now a grandmother.

References

External links

American Dance Machine

1987 deaths
American choreographers
American musical theatre actresses
Year of birth missing
20th-century American actresses